Vertiv is an American, Ohio-based, provider of equipment and services for data centers.

Platinum Equity acquired the Emerson Network Power business from Emerson Electric in a transaction valued in excess of $4 billion, completed in December 2016. Emerson Network Power was rebranded as Vertiv. Emerson also retained a subordinated equity piece in the company.

Headquartered in Westerville, Ohio, Vertiv has ~24,000 employees, with business in more than 130 countries, and 23 manufacturing and assembly facilities. The company has regional headquarters in: Bologna, Italy; Miami, Florida; Pasig, Manila, Philippines; Nanshan District, Shenzhen, China; and Mumbai, India.

Through a merger with GS Acquisition Holdings, the company became publicly traded on the New York Stock Exchange (NYSE) on February 10, 2020.

History

Liebert Corporation 
Vertiv began as Capitol Refrigeration Industries, established in 1946 by Ralph Liebert (1918–1984) in Columbus, Ohio. Liebert Corporation was formed in 1965 as the industry's first manufacturer of computer room air conditioning (CRAC) systems, with just five associates. In 1977, Liebert launched Conditioned Power Corporation to design and manufacture power distribution, conditioning and monitoring systems for the data processing industry. Ralph Liebert's son, Larry Liebert, took over the company as president in 1980 and served in this position until 1989. In 1981, Liebert became a public company, listed on the NASDAQ under the symbol LIEB. In 1983, Liebert acquired Franklin Electric subsidiary, Programmed Power Corporation, expanding the company's power division capabilities to include the design and manufacture of uninterruptible power supplies (UPS).

Emerson Network Power 
Liebert Corporation was acquired by Emerson Electric in 1987. In 2000, Emerson formed its Network Power (ENP) business, integrating critical infrastructure technologies under a single brand. The following decade saw an expansion of ENP with various acquisitions. In 2001, the company increased is presence in Asia with the purchase of Avansys and formation of ENP India. ENP expanded its telecom industry solutions with the 2004 acquisition of Marconi outside plant and power system. In 2006, ENP acquired Germany-based Knürr AG, a leading provider of enclosure systems. Avocent and Chloride were acquired in 2009 and 2010 respectively.

Vertiv
In 2016, following Platinum Equity's $4 billion acquisition of ENP, the company officially commenced a campaign to rebrand under the name Vertiv. Vertiv launched as a stand-alone business and announced the appointment of Rob Johnson as chief executive officer. In 2017, Vertiv sold its ASCO power switch business to Schneider Electric for $1.25 billion. The company made three acquisitions in 2018; Energy Labs, Geist and MEMS. After merging with GS Acquisition Holdings in 2020, Vertiv Holdings Co became public on the New York Stock Exchange (NYSE: VRT). In 2021, Vertiv acquired E+I Engineering, a global provider of switchgear, busway and modular power solutions power, for $1.8 billion.

On October 3, 2022, Vertiv announced that Giordano Albertazzi will succeed Rob Johnson as CEO effective January 1, 2023.

Giordano Albertazzi became Vertiv's Chief Executive Officer in January 2023 and retains his role as President, of Americas until a replacement is named.

Current work 
Vertiv's primary customers are businesses across three main end markets: data centers, communication networks and commercial & industrial environments. Its principal offerings include:

 Critical infrastructure & solutions: AC and DC power management, thermal management, and integrated modular solutions.
 Integrated Rack Solutions: racks, rack power, rack power distribution, rack thermal systems, configurable integrated solutions, and hardware for managing I.T. equipment.
 Services & spares: services include preventative maintenance, acceptance testing, engineering and consulting, performance assessments, remote monitoring, training, spare parts, and critical digital infrastructure software.

Research and Development 
Vertiv invests approximately 5% of sales into research and development. In 2020, Vertiv spent $228.6 million on research and development.

Partnerships 
In April 2021, Vertiv was announced as Founding Partner and Official Data Center Equipment Provider of Columbus Crew.

Acquisitions

Brands
Vertiv's brands include:

Albér (Battery Monitoring)
Avocent (IT Management)
Cybex (IT Management)
E+I Engineering Group (Electrical Switchgear, Modular Power, Energy Management)
Energy Labs (Commercial and Industrial Thermal)
Geist (Rack PDU)
Liebert (AC Power and Thermal)
Netsure (DC Power)
PowerBar (Busbar Trunking)

References

External links

Manufacturing companies based in Ohio
Companies based in the Columbus, Ohio metropolitan area
2016 mergers and acquisitions
Private equity portfolio companies
Special-purpose acquisition companies
Companies listed on the New York Stock Exchange
American brands
Manufacturing companies established in 2016
American companies established in 2016
Multinational companies headquartered in the United States